George McMurtry may refer to:

 George G. McMurtry (1876–1958), officer in United States Army and Medal of Honor recipient
 George McMurtry (engineer) (1867–1918), New Zealand scientist, smelting engineer and mining manager